Co-op Academy Bebington (formerly Bebington High Sports College and Bebington High School) is an 11–18 mixed, secondary school and sixth form with academy status in Bebington, Merseyside, England. It was established in 1915 and adopted its present name after becoming an academy in April 2019. It is part of the Co-op Academies Trust.

History 
Bebington High School opened in 1915 in order to train future recruits during the height of World War I. The school has remained open since the end of World War I.
It was renamed as Bebington High Sports College in 2004; it was a foundation school administered by Wirral Metropolitan Borough Council and a charitable foundation trust. Partners of the sports college included Liverpool John Moores University, Barnardo's and Tranmere Rovers F.C. The school was designated a specialist Sports College in 2001.

There was an inspection in 2006 that described Bebington High Sports College, as an average-sized comprehensive school situated in a residential area of the Wirral, some parts of which have significant levels of social and economic disadvantage. The number of students then eligible for free school meals was over a quarter, twice the national average. 20% of students, had learning difficulties and/or disabilities: of these, 27 had a formal SEN statement.

The college had a long history of underperforming. In 2013, it was put into special measures. Wirral replaced the school’s governing body with an interim executive board, made up of experienced people who, alongside the headteacher, have made major changes. The leadership and teachers were replaced. According to Ofsted, members of the interim board hold accurate view of the quality of education that the school provides They recognise that previously pupils did not have high enough, but though the strategies are good, the outcomes have not worked through the system.

In April 2019, it became an academy as part of the Co-op Academies Trust and renamed as Co-op Academy Bebington.

Academics 
As Bebington High Sports College, it offered GCSEs and BTECs as programmes of study for pupils while students in the sixth form have the option to study from a range of A-levels and further BTECs.

Notable alumni 
Bebington High School
 Pete Burns, musician, singer, songwriter, and television personality

References

External links 
 

Secondary schools in the Metropolitan Borough of Wirral
Academies in the Metropolitan Borough of Wirral
Educational institutions established in 1915
1915 establishments in England